Omphalotus olivascens, commonly known as the western jack-o'-lantern mushroom, is an orange to brown-colored gilled mushroom native to California and Mexico.

Taxonomy
The fungus was described as new to science in 1976 by American mycologists Howard E. Bigelow, Orson K. Miller Jr., and Harry D. Thiers. A subspecies with blue flesh, O. olivascens var. indigo, was described growing on live oak in Baja California, Mexico.

Description
To an untrained eye, O. olivascens appears similar to some chanterelles, but unlike the chanterelle, the jack-o'-lantern mushroom has true, blade-like gills (rather than ridges) and it can have olive coloration that chanterelles lack; also, Omphalotus species are saprotrophic, grow directly on wood, and are bioluminescent.

The spores are white to pale yellow.

Ecology
A saprobe or parasite, O. nidiformis is nonspecific in its needs and is compatible with a wide variety of hosts.

Omphalotus species cause a white rot by breaking down lignin in their tree hosts.

Biochemistry
The jack o'lantern mushroom is poisonous; while not lethal, consuming this mushroom leads to very severe cramps, vomiting, and diarrhea.

The toxic ingredient of many species of Omphalotus is a sesquiterpene compound known as illudin S. This, along with illudin M, have been identified in O. nidiformis. The two illudins are common to the genus Omphalotus and not found in any other basidiomycete mushroom.

Similar species

Several Omphalotus species with similar bioluminescent properties occur worldwide, all of which are presumed poisonous. The best known are the North American jack o'lantern mushroom (O. olearius) and the tsukiyotake (O. japonicus (Kawam.) Kirchm. & O.K. Mill. (formerly known as Lampteromyces japonicus (Kawam.) Sing.), found in Japan and eastern Asia. Molecular analysis shows the jack-o'-Lantern to be most closely related to the ghost fungus Omphalotus nidiformis. Miller notes that the colours and shades of the ghost fungus most closely resemble this species.

Gymnopilus junonius is another similar-looking species.

See also
List of bioluminescent fungus species

References

External links

Bioluminescent fungi
olivascens
Poisonous fungi
Fungi described in 1976
Fungi of North America
Fungi of Mexico
Fungi without expected TNC conservation status
Fungi of California